Ponerorchis hemipilioides is a species of orchid endemic to China, known from only Yunnan and Guizhou. It produces pinkish flowers with purplish spots.

References 

Endemic orchids of China
hemipilioides
Endangered plants
Flora of Guizhou
Orchids of Yunnan
Taxobox binomials not recognized by IUCN